The 1947 Little League World Series took place from August 21 through August 23, when the first Little League Baseball championship tournament was played at Williamsport, Pennsylvania. The Maynard Midgets of Williamsport, Pennsylvania, defeated the Lock Haven All Stars of Lock Haven, Pennsylvania, 16–7 to win the championship. The event was called the National Little League Tournament, as the "World Series" naming was not adopted until .

In 1947, the board of directors for the original Little League decided to organize a tournament for the 17 known Little League programs. The fields on which the games were played are between the street and a levee built to protect the town from the West Branch Susquehanna River. That levee provided most of the seating for the inaugural series' attendees. Although the Little League World Series has now moved to a stadium in South Williamsport, it's still possible to play baseball on the original field.

The inaugural series was important in history in that it was integrated at a time when professional baseball was still integrating. More than 2,500 spectators enjoyed the final game, which helped to increase the League's overall publicity.

Teams

Williamsport Teams
 Original League
 Sunday School League
 Brandon League
 Maynard League

 Lincoln League – Newberry, PA
 Montoursville, PA
 Montgomery, PA
 Jersey Shore, PA
 Milton, PA
 Perry County, PA
 Hammonton, NJ
 Lock Haven, PA

Results

Rain on August 21 caused two first round games to be played on August 22.
Source:

Notable players
 Jack Losch of the Maynard League championship team went on to play college football with the Miami Hurricanes, and was a first-round selection in the 1956 NFL Draft. That year, with the Green Bay Packers, he became the first LLWS participant to play a professional sport. In 2004, the Team Sportsmanship Award at the LLWS was named in his honor.

References

External links
 1947 Tournament Bracket via Wayback Machine
 1947 Line Scores via Wayback Machine

Little League World Series
Little League World Series
Little League World Series